Letting Go...Slow is a studio album by American country artist, Lorrie Morgan. It was released on February 12, 2016, via Shanachie Records and contained 12 tracks. The project was Morgan's sixteenth studio album and her first album of solo material in seven years. The album contained both original material and cover recordings. The album received mixed reviews from critics and reached the American country albums chart.

Background
Lorrie Morgan had been among country music's most commercially-successful recording artists during the 1990s. A string of her singles reached the country chart top ten, including three number one singles: "Five Minutes" (1990), "What Part of No" (1992) and "I Didn't Know My Own Strength" (1995). With the exception of a collaborative album in 2013 with Pam Tillis, Morgan had not released a proper studio album of solo material since 2009's A Moment in Time. According to Morgan, she had lost motivation after listening to contemporary country radio. "I wasn't happy with the music I was hearing, what was being played on the radio, and what radio thought were great songs, I thought were not great songs. So I just kinda lost my confidence in, did I think I could do a good job on a new album?", she told Taste of Country.

In an interview with Florida Today, Morgan also explained that the lack of finding a label also accounted for the delay in making the album. Morgan's divorce from ex-husband and country artist, Sammy Kershaw, also added a delay in recording. "My last divorce with Sammy Kershaw was one of the hardest things I ever experienced in my life," she explained in 2016. The album's future title track inspired the project's creation. Penned by Morgan's daughter-in-law (Ashley Hewitt), the song captured the pain of letting go from a relationship. "And when I heard ‘Letting You Go Slow’, it just took me back to that pain and I said, ‘I need to sing about this. I’ve got to sing about this’," she told Parade.

Recording and content
Letting Go...Slow contained a total of 12 tracks and was produced by Richard Landis. Landis had produced many of Morgan's previous albums and she enjoyed collaborating with him again. His "out of the box ideas" and introduction to various musical collaborators prompted her to work with him for the project again. Morgan chose material that would please her fans rather than please radio. Some of the recordings had been songs she had wanted to record for 20 years. Letting Go...Slow mixed both original recordings and covers of previously-recorded material. Among the album's covers is Patsy Cline's "Strange" and Bobbie Gentry's "Ode to Billie Joe". She also covered several songs by male artists, such as Vern Gosdin's "Is It Raining at Your House", Bob Dylan's "Lay Lady Lay" and Earl Thomas Conley's "What I'd Say". Original material included "Jesus & Hairspray" and "How Does It Feel". The latter recording featured writing credits from Morgan herself.

Release, chart performance and reception

Letting Go...Slow was released on February 12, 2016, on Shanachie Records. It was offered as a compact disc, music download and for streaming purposes. It was her first solo album to make the American Billboard Top Country Albums survey since 2009. It spent one week on the Country Albums survey in March 2016, peaking at number 47. The album received mixed reception from critics and journalists. Stephen Thomas Erlewine of AllMusic, gave the project three out of five possible stars. Erlewine favored the "relaxing gait" of the album's production and sound. "What's best about Letting Go…Slow is its relaxed conversational intimacy: this plays not like a missive from a star but like a long, lazy talk between old friends," he concluded. Meanwhile, Robert Loy of Country Standard Time criticized the album. Loy disliked Morgan's choices of covering material from previous artists, such as "Ode to Billie Joe" and "Lay Lady Lay". He also cited her habit of smoking cigarettes to be unfavorable to the sound of the record.  "Sorry, Lorrie, but maybe it's those comeback dreams you ought to let go," Loy concluded.

Track listing

Personnel
All credits are adapted from the liner notes of Letting Go...Slow and AllMusic.

Musical personnel
 Pat Bergeson – Harmonica
 Steve Brewster – Drums
 Pat Buchanan – Electric guitar
 Billy Davis Jr. – Background vocals
 Chip Davis – Background vocals
 Larry Franklin – Fiddle
 Steve Hinson – Dobro, steel guitar
 Jim Horn – Flute
 Rodney Ingle – Background vocals
 Lorrie Morgan – Lead vocals
 Wendy Moten – Background vocals
 Jimmy Nichols – Keyboards
 Dave Pomeroy – Bass
 Bobby Terry – Acoustic guitar
 Ashley Hewitt Whitley – Background vocals

Technical personnel
 Austin Atwood – Assistant
 Lorien Babajian – Design
 Jim DeMain – Mastering
 Richard Landis – Arranger, producer
 Matt Legge – Engineer, mixing
 Amy Marie – Assistant
 Matt Spicher – Photography

Chart performance

Release history

References

2016 albums
Albums produced by Richard Landis
Lorrie Morgan albums
Shanachie Records albums